The following are the records of Guyana in Olympic weightlifting. Records are maintained in each weight class for the snatch lift, clean and jerk lift, and the total for both lifts by the Guyana Amateur Weightlifting Association.

Men

Women

References

records
Guyana
weightlifting